Sidney Parker is the name of:

Sid Parker (born 1930), Canadian politician
Sidney Parker (anarchist) (born 1929), British anarchist
Sidney Parker (rugby player) (1852-1897), English rugby international